Wu Yibing defeated John Isner in the final, 6–7(4–7), 7–6(7–3), 7–6(14–12) to win the singles tennis title at the 2023 Dallas Open. Wu became the first Chinese man in the Open Era to reach an ATP Tour singles final and win a title. He saved four championship points en route to the title.

Reilly Opelka was the reigning champion, but withdrew before the tournament, where he was replaced by Wu.

Seeds
The top four seeds received a bye into the second round.

Draw

Finals

Top half

Bottom half

Qualifying

Seeds

Qualifiers

Lucky loser

Qualifying draw

First qualifier

Second qualifier

Third qualifier

Fourth qualifier

References

External links
 Main draw
 Qualifying draw

Dallas Open - 1
Dallas Open (2022)